Take You There may refer to:

 "Take You There" (Donnie Klang song), 2008
 "Take You There" (Mànran & Michelle McManus song)
 "Take You There" (Pete Rock & CL Smooth song), 1994
 "Take You There" (Sean Kingston song), 2007
 "Take You There" (Jodie Connor song), 2012

See also
 "I'll Take You There", a 1972 song by The Staple Singers
 "Take Ü There", a 2014 song by Jack Ü featuring Kiesza